Zapolice  is a village in the administrative district of Gmina Trzebiatów, within Gryfice County, West Pomeranian Voivodeship, in north-western Poland. 

The village has a population of 81.

References

Zapolice